The 2006–07 Michigan State Spartans men's basketball team represented Michigan State University in the 2006–07 NCAA Division I men's basketball season. The head coach was Tom Izzo who was in his 12th year. The team played their home games at the Breslin Center in East Lansing, Michigan. MSU finished the season 23–12, 8–8 in  Big Ten play to finish in a tie for seventh place. The Spartans received their tenth consecutive bid to the NCAA tournament where they lost in the Second Round to North Carolina.

Previous season 
The Spartans finished the 2005–06 season 22–12,  8–8 in Big Ten play to finish in sixth place. Michigan State received an at-large bid as a No. 6 seed to the NCAA tournament, their ninth straight trip to the Tournament, and lost in the First Round.

The Spartans lost seniors Paul Davis (17.5 points and 9.1 rebounds per game), Maurice Ager (19.3 points per game) and junior Shannon Brown (17.2 points per game) to the NBA draft following the season.

Season summary 
MSU was led by junior Drew Neitzel (18.1 points and 4.3 assist per game) and freshman Raymar Morgan (11.7 points and 5.2 rebounds per game).

Non-conference 
MSU started the season well with wins over Brown, Youngstown State, and The Citidel in East Lansing. The Spartans then participated in the Coaches vs. Cancer Classic held at Madison Square Garden where they edged out No. 19 Texas in the semifinals on a Drew Neitzel last second basket. In the championship game, the Spartans lost on a controversial no-call of a shot clock violation which allowed Maryland to maintain their lead and hold off the Spartans 62–59. Wins over Vermont and Oakland at Breslin Center led to a loss at Boston College in the ACC–Big Ten Challenge. MSU closed the non-conference schedule strong, winning their last seven games. However, the Spartans finished the non-conference slate 1–2 in their only trips outside the state of Michigan in the non-conference schedule. MSU finished the non-conference schedule with a record of 13–2, but was not ranked in the polls.

Big Ten play 
Following back-to-back losses to open the Big Ten season the prior year, the Spartans again suffered back-to-losses to open the season, this time on the road to Iowa and Indiana. The remaining Big Ten season was a roller coaster with a four-game winning streak immediately followed by a four-game losing streak and losses to Ohio State (ranked No. 4 and No. 5). A win against No. 1 Wisconsin highlighted the Big Ten season and likely assured the Spartans a trip to the NCAA Tournament. The Spartans finished 8–8 in conference, finishing in a tie for seventh place. MSU lost to Wisconsin after beating Northwestern in the Big Ten tournament.

NCAA Tournament 
Helped by the win over No. 1 Wisconsin, the Spartans received an at-large bid to the NCAA tournament for the 10th consecutive year, receiving a No. 9 seed, their lowest seed since 2002. A victory over Marquette, coached by former Izzo assistant Tom Crean, in the First Round of the Tournament was followed by a loss to No. 3 North Carolina in the Second Round.

Roster

Schedule and results

|-
!colspan=9 style=| Exhibition

|-
!colspan=9 style=| Non-conference regular season

|-
!colspan=9 style=|Big Ten regular season

|-
!colspan=9 style=|Big Ten tournament

|- 
!colspan=9 style=|NCAA tournament

Source

Player statistics 

Source

Rankings

*AP does not release post-NCAA Tournament rankings.

Awards and honors 
 Drew Neitzel – All-Big Ten First Team
 Drew Neitzel – USBWA All-District Team
 Travis Walton – Big Ten All-Defensive Team
 Drew Neitzel – AP All-American Honorable Mention

References

Michigan State Spartans men's basketball seasons
Michigan State Spartans
Michigan State
2006 in sports in Michigan
2007 in sports in Michigan